Danielle Thomas (born 23 April 1973) is an Australian former professional tennis player.

Thomas competed on the professional tour in the early 1990s, reaching a best ranking of 384 in singles and 237 in doubles. Her biggest achievement was qualifying for the main draw of the women's doubles at the 1993 Wimbledon Championships, with Austria's Heidi Sprung. They were beaten in the first round by Lindsay Davenport and Chanda Rubin.

ITF finals

Doubles (1–2)

References

External links
 
 

1973 births
Living people
Australian female tennis players